The Nivvāṇalīlāvaīkahā (Nivvāṇa-līlāvaī-kahā) 'Story of the Final Emancipation of Līlāvatī' composed in 1036 by Jineshvara, a Jain monk. The work was composed in Jain Maharashtri, a Prakrit language. Jineshvara was a reformist of lax monasticism, and his work was considered highly conducive to liberation.
The primary purpose of Jain narrative literature was to edify lay people through amusement; consequently the stories are racy, and in some cases the moralising element is rather tenuous. The main feature of Jain narrative literature is its concern with past and future lives. There developed a genre of soul biography, the histories, over a succession of rebirths, of a group of characters who exemplified the vices of anger, pride, deceit, greed and delusion.
A Sanskrit abridgement of Nivvāṇalīlāvaīkahā was made by Jinaratna, pupil of Jineshvara, by the title Līlāvatīsāra.

See also
Līlāvatīsāra(The Epitome of Lilavati)
Jinaratna

Jain texts